This is an index of some of the lists of plants.

Plant list articles
Lists of cultivars
List of garden plants

List of plants by common name
List of lyrate plants

List of Amaryllidoideae genera
List of Liliaceae genera
List of Orchidaceae genera
List of Phyllanthaceae genera
List of Picrodendraceae genera
Lists of trees
List of Clusiaceae genera

By place

List of flora of the Lower Colorado River Valley
List of plants of Malaysia
List of plants of the Amazon rainforest
List of plants from the mountains of Romania
List of plants of the Sierra Nevada (U.S.)
List of Sonoran Desert wildflowers

List of threatened flora of Australia
List of the vascular plants in the Red Data Book of Russia

By topic

List of plants used in herbalism
List of plants in the Bible
List of plants known as nettle
List of plants known as oil palm
List of plants poisonous to equines
List of poisonous plants

Lists of algae
By taxonomic classification
List of brown algal genera
List of Chlorophyceae genera
List of Mamiellophyceae genera
List of Trebouxiophyceae genera
List of Ulvophyceae genera

By geographic location
List of algae of the Houtman Abrolhos

See also

 List of animals